Gilbert Marie Michel Méranville (born 4 February 1936) is the Roman Catholic archbishop emeritus of the Archdiocese of Fort-de-France in Martinique. Archbishop Méranville was ordained a priest in 1959, and on 14 November 2003, he succeeded Archbishop Maurice Rigobert Marie-Sainte as the Metropolitan Archbishop of Fort-de-France. His resignation for age reasons was accepted by Pope Francis on Saturday, 7 March 2015. That day, Pope named Father David Macaire, O.P., prior of the Dominican convent of La Sainte-Baume, in Toulon, France, as Archbishop-elect of Fort-de-France. He will be consecrated and installed as archbishop at a date in the near future.

References

External links

Metropolitan Archdiocese of Fort-de-France Martinique

1936 births
Martiniquais Roman Catholic archbishops
21st-century Roman Catholic archbishops in France
Living people
Roman Catholic archbishops of Fort-de-France–Saint-Pierre